Mboro is a town in the Thiès Region of western Senegal. It is in the Tivaouane Department. The population in 2013 was 27,693. 

The town received commune status in 2002. Mboro is situated 25 km west of Tivaouane and 117 km north of Dakar. There is a phosphate mine and factory in Mboro.

References

Populated places in Thiès Region
Communes of Senegal